Albadaria  is a town and sub-prefecture in the Kissidougou Prefecture in the Faranah Region of Guinea. As of 2014 it had a population of 17,147 people.

Notable residents
 Mory Kanté (1950–2020), Guinean singer and musician

References

Sub-prefectures of the Faranah Region